Amir Altoury (born 2 September 2003) is an Israeli footballer who currently plays as a forward for Maccabi Petah Tikva.

Career statistics

Club

References 

2003 births
Living people
Israeli footballers
Israel youth international footballers
Association football forwards
Maccabi Petah Tikva F.C. players
Israeli Premier League players
Liga Leumit players
Footballers from Kafr Qasim